These are the official results of the Men's 100 metres event at the 1999 IAAF World Championships in Seville, Spain. There were a total number of 77 participating athletes, with ten qualifying heats, five quarter-finals, two semi-finals and the final held on Sunday 22 August 1999 at 21:15h.

Final

Semi-final
Held on Sunday 22 August 1999

Quarter-finals
Held on Saturday 21 August 1999

Heats
Held on Saturday 21 August 1999

References
 

H
100 metres at the World Athletics Championships